Champara or Champará is a mountain in the north of the Cordillera Blanca in the Andes of Peru and has an elevation of . It is located in Yuracmarca District, Huaylas Province, within the region of Ancash. Champara lies southeast of the lake Quyllurqucha.

References

Mountains of Peru
Mountains of Ancash Region